This is a list of smoked foods. Smoking is the process of flavoring, cooking, or preserving food by exposing it to smoke from burning or smoldering material, most often wood. Foods have been smoked by humans throughout history. Meats and fish are the most common smoked foods, though cheeses, vegetables, and ingredients used to make beverages such as whisky, smoked beer, and lapsang souchong tea are also smoked. Smoked beverages are also included in this list.

Smoked foods

Beverages

 Lapsang souchong a kind of tea.
 Mattha - an Indian buttermilk or yogurt drink that is sometimes smoked
 Smoked beer – beer with a distinctive smoke flavor imparted by using malted barley dried over an open flame
 Grätzer
 Suanmeitang - a Chinese smoked plum drink
 Scotch Whisky Some scotch is made from grains that have been smoked over a peat fire.

Cheeses

Smoked cheese is any cheese that has been specially treated by smoke-curing. It typically has a yellowish-brown outer pellicle which is a result of this curing process.

 Ardrahan Cheese – company that produces a smoked variety of their Ardrahan cheese
 Bandel cheese
 Brânză de coșuleț
 Chechil
 Cheddar cheese – some versions are smoked
 Circassian smoked cheese
 Corleggy Cheese – company that produces some versions of smoked cheese, such as their Corleggy, Drumlin and Creeny varieties
 Gamonéu cheese
 Gouda cheese
 Burren Gold
 Gubbeen Farmhouse Cheese
 Idiazabal cheese
 Korbáčik – type of string cheese made from steamed cheese interwoven into fine braids. Common flavors include salty, smoked and garlic.
 Kwaito cheese
 Lincolnshire Poacher cheese
 Metsovone – produced by the Aromanians in Greece, has been a European protected designation of origin since 1996
 Mozzarella – mozzarella affumicata is a term for the smoked variety
 Oscypek – smoked sheep milk cheese, made exclusively in the Tatra Mountains region of Poland
 Oštiepok
 Palmero cheese
 Parenica – traditional Slovakian cheese; a semi-firm, non-ripening, semi-fat, steamed and usually smoked cheese, although the non-smoked version is also produced
 Provolone – some versions are smoked
 Pule cheese – reportedly the "world's most expensive cheese" priced at 1,000 Euros per kilogram; a smoked cheese made from the milk of Balkan donkeys from Serbia 
 San Simón cheese
 Rauchkäse
 Ricotta
 Rygeost – traditional Danish cheese made from soured buttermilk smoked with straw and stinging nettles
 Scamorza
Sulguni - traditional Georgian salted smoked cheese
 Tesyn
 Wensleydale cheese – produces Oak Smoked Wensleydale

Fish

Smoked fish is fish that has been cured by smoking. This was originally done as a preservative.
 African longfin eel – has fatty flesh which is prized in a smoked or jellied dish
 Arbroath smokie
 Atlantic mackerel
 Bokkoms
 Bonga shad
 Buckling
 Cakalang fufu - a smoked tuna dish of the Minahasan people of Indonesia
 Smoked catfish
 Caviar substitutes
 Lysekil Caviar - a paste made of smoked cod roe, canola oil, sugar, onion, tomato sauce and salt
 Smörgåskaviar - a Scandinavian smoked fish roe spread
 Cod
 Finnan haddie
 Goldeye
 Gwamegi - Korean style smoked half-dried fish
 Herring
 Bloater
 Blueback herring
 Craster kipper
 Kipper
 Katsuobushi - Japanese smoked and fermented skipjack tuna (bonito)
 Mullet
 Pudpod - Filipino smoked fish patty usually made from anchovies
 Saramură
 Sardine
 Scad
 Smoked salmon
 Lox
 Sprat
 Tinapa - native smoked fish delicacy in the Philippines
 Traditional Grimsby smoked fish
 Trout

Seafood
 Smoked eel
 Smoked mussel
 Smoked oyster
 Smoked scallop

Meats

Smoked meat is a method of preparing red meat (and fish) which originates in prehistory. Its purpose is to preserve these protein-rich foods, which would otherwise spoil quickly, for long periods. There are two mechanisms for this preservation: dehydration and the antibacterial properties of absorbed smoke. In modern days, the enhanced flavor of smoked foods makes them a delicacy in many cultures.
 Bacon – a meat product prepared from a pig and usually cured; some versions are also smoked for preservation or to add flavor
 Back bacon
 Brési
 Burnt ends – flavorful pieces of meat cut from the point half of a smoked brisket
 Cecina – in Spanish, means "meat that has been salted and dried by means of air, sun or smoke"
 Charcuterie
 Chaudin
 Dutch loaf
 Elenski but
 Flurgönder – a smoked head cheese
 Gammon
 Grjúpán
 Hangikjöt
 Horse meat – a major meat in only a few countries, it is sometimes smoked
 Qarta – boiled and pan-fried horse rectum, it is sometimes smoked
 Zhal – a Kazakh cuisine dish of smoked horse neck lard
 Jeju Black pig
 Jerky
 Kassler
 Meatloaf
 Montreal-style smoked meat
 Pastrami
 Pickled pigs' feet
 Pig candy
 Pitina
 Pork jowl
 Oreilles de crisse
 Pork tail
 Salo
 Schäufele
 Se'i
 Smalahove
 Sopocka
 Speck
 Speck Alto Adige PGI
 Tyrolean Speck
 Suho meso
 Szalonna
 Turkey bacon
 Zhangcha duck

Hams

 Ham
 Ammerländer Schinken – a type of dry-cured (and normally smoked) ham produced in the Ammerland area of North Germany. It has PGI status under EU law.
 Black Forest ham
 Christmas ham – some versions are smoked
 Country ham
 Ham hock
 Eisbein
 Stuffed ham
 Tasso ham
 Westphalia ham

Sausages

Sausage is a food usually made from ground meat with a skin around it. Typically, a sausage is formed in a casing traditionally made from intestine, but sometimes synthetic. Sausage making is a traditional food preservation technique. Sausages may be preserved by curing, drying, or smoking. Many types and varieties of sausages are smoked to help preserve them and to add flavor.
 Ahle Wurst – a hard pork sausage made in northern Hesse, Germany. Its name is a dialectal form of alte Wurst – "old sausage". 
 Alheira
 Amsterdam ossenworst
 Andouille
 Bierwurst
 Bockwurst
 Bologna sausage
 Boudin
 Breakfast sausage
 Cabanossi
 Chinese sausage – a generic term referring to the many different types of sausages originating in China
 Chorizo
 Ciauscolo
 Debrecener
 Embutido
 Farinheira
 Frankfurter Würstchen
 Half-smoke
 Hungarian sausages – The cuisine of Hungary produces a vast number of types of sausages.  
 Isterband
 Kielbasa
 Knackwurst
 Knipp
 Kochwurst
 Kohlwurst
 Krakowska
 Kulen
 Lebanon bologna
 Linguiça
 Liverwurst
 Braunschweiger
 Loukaniko
 Lukanka
 Lucanica
 Mettwurst
 Morteau sausage
 Nădlac sausage
 Pinkel
 Rookworst
 Salami
 Skilandis
 Sremska kobasica
 Summer sausage
 Teewurst
 Vienna sausage
 Winter salami

Spices
 Liquid smoke
 Merkén
 Paprika
 Smoked salt

Other
 Alinazik kebab – a Turkish smoked eggplant dish
 Baingan bharta - a South Asian smoked eggplant dish
 Chipotle - smoke-dried jalapeño chili pepper popular in Mexico and the American Southwest
 Jallab - a Middle-Eastern fruit and rose syrup smoked with Arabic incense
 Smoked egg - smoked quail or other fowl eggs 
 Smoked garlic - popular in several areas of the world
 Smoked plum - an East Asian smoked fruit also used to make the Korean medicinal tea, Jeho-tang

See also

 Barbecue
 Barbecue in the United States
 List of barbecue dishes
 Brining
 Crazy Snake Rebellion
 Curing
 Drying
 Fumarium
 List of bacon dishes
 List of dried foods
 List of hams
 List of pork dishes
 List of ham dishes
 List of sausage dishes
 List of sausages
 List of spit-roasted foods
 Sausage making
 Smokehouse
 Smoke ring (cooking)

In cuisines
 Akan cuisine
 Naga cuisine
 Yamal cuisine – Hot smoked fish

References

External links
 
 
 
 
 

Smoked food
Food processing
smoked